Community Legal Assistance Society (CLAS), which previously went by the name Vancouver Community Legal Assistance Society (V-CLAS), is a non-governmental organization in British Columbia, Canada which provides legal services to low- and moderate-income persons in the areas of mental health law, human rights law, and poverty law. Founded in 1971, CLAS is often referred to as Canada's first community law office. CLAS operates a BC Human Rights Clinic, a Mental Health Law Program, and a poverty law-focused Community Law Program.

History 
CLAS was founded by future British Columbia premier Mike Harcourt. In the summer of 1971, it opened its first office at 527 East Broadway in Vancouver. Its staff have been considered leaders in the field of disability and human rights law and the Supreme Court of Canada has noted how frequently CLAS represents accused persons with mental health issues. CLAS is billed as seeking to advance access to justice through the use of innovative legal tools.  For instance, when a lawyer at CLAS, former MLA, Ian Waddell launched the first successful consumer class action in Canada.

References

See also
 Legal Services Society
 Law Society of British Columbia
 British Columbia Civil Liberties Association

Legal aid